Wierzbica  is a village in the administrative district of Gmina Rudnik, within Krasnystaw County, Lublin Voivodeship, in eastern Poland.

The village has a population of 270.

References

Wierzbica